Brittany Michelle Friedman is an American sociologist focusing on criminology, racial inequality, and incarceration.  She is currently Assistant Professor of Sociology at the University of Southern California and Faculty Affiliate of the Sol Price Center for Social Innovation and the Equity Research Institute.  Her research intersects at the sociology of law, sociology of race, economic sociology, and criminal justice.  Friedman is most known for her research on the Black Guerilla Family and the black power movement behind bars, and the financialization of the criminal legal system. She is an outspoken proponent of criminal justice reform and a frequent commentator on public media outlets.   Her most notable project is a book manuscript tracing the relationship between the rise of the Black Guerilla Family in California, institutional logics, and racial oppression.  Separate work includes studies of monetary sanctions in the criminal legal system and policies such as pay-to-stay.  

Friedman's research has been supported by a variety of funding sources, such as the National Science Foundation, the American Society of Criminology, and the American Bar Foundation.

Friedman completed her bachelor of arts in History at Vanderbilt University, her master of arts in Latin American Studies at Columbia University, and her PhD in Sociology at Northwestern University under the direction of acclaimed sociologist John Hagan.

Awards and honors (selected) 

 DDRI, National Science Foundation, 2017
 Ruth D. Peterson Fellowship, American Society of Criminology, 2014
Access to Justice Faculty Scholar, American Bar Foundation, 2021

References 

Living people
Rutgers University faculty
Argonne National Laboratory people
Race and crime in the United States
Crime in Brazil
Vanderbilt University alumni
Columbia Graduate School of Arts and Sciences alumni
Northwestern University alumni
American sociologists
American women sociologists
1989 births